Dargis is a surname. Notable people with the surname include:

 Manohla Dargis (born 1961), film critic for The New York Times
 Lord Dargis, character in the movie Garfield: A Tail of Two Kitties